Butterflies Go Free is an annual exhibit at the Jardin Botanique de Montreal, featuring thousands of live tropical butterflies and moths released in the Grande Serre of the exhibition greenhouses. The insects are purchased in caterpillar and egg form from sustainable butterfly farms.

The exhibit, which was first shown in 1997, is presented each year from February to April.

References

External links

List of species present in Butterflies Go Free

Exhibitions in Montreal
Butterfly houses
Articles containing video clips
Spring (season) events in Canada